Iolaus sidus, the red-line sapphire or red-line sapphire blue, is a butterfly of the family Lycaenidae. It is found from South Africa to Mozambique, Zambia, Zimbabwe and then to Kenya and Uganda. In South Africa it is found from the coastal woodland in the Eastern Cape to Tongaland and Bedford, the thorn belt of KwaZulu-Natal and then to Eswatini and Mpumalanga.

The wingspan is 28–31 mm for males and 29–32.5 mm for females. Adults are on wing year round with peaks in summer.

The larvae feed on Moquiniella rubra, Tieghemia quinquenervia, Tapinanthus oleifolius, Tapinanthus kraussianus, Tapinanthus brunneus and Tapinanthus subulatus.

References

External links

Images representing Iolaus sidus at Barcodes of Life
Die Gross-Schmetterlinge der Erde 13: Die Afrikanischen Tagfalter. Plate XIII 68 g

Butterflies described in 1864
Iolaus (butterfly)
Butterflies of Africa
Taxa named by Roland Trimen